is a district of Toshima, Tokyo, Japan. The current administrative place names are Minaminagasaki 1-chome and Minami-Nagasaki 6-chome.

References

External links

Districts of Toshima